Quintus Tineius Rufus was a Roman senator who was consul ordinarius in 182 with Marcus Petronius Sura Mamertinus as his consul prior. In 170 he was a member of the college of the Salii Palatini.

The son of Quintus Tineius Sacerdos Clemens, consul in 158, his brothers were Quintus Tineius Clemens and Quintus Tineius Sacerdos.

Family tree

References

2nd-century Romans
Year of birth unknown
Year of death unknown
Imperial Roman consuls
Rufus, Quintus